Silodam is a housing development and mix use (office / commercial / meeting place / public space) complex located in Oude Houthaven in the Netherlands. The complex is designed by MVRDV.

Built on a former breakwater and incorporating grain silos known as the Stone Silo (c. 1896-1898 and restored by André van Stigt) was constructed from 1995 to 2003. Within the container complex are 95 units for housing and the rest for mix use.

See also
 Habitat 67

References 

Buildings and structures completed in 2003
Buildings and structures in the Netherlands
Residential buildings completed in 2003
Visionary environments